Clobetasol is a synthetic glucocorticoid corticosteroid. A propionate ester of clobetasol, clobetasol propionate, has also been marketed, and is far more widely used in comparison.

References

Diketones
Diols
Fluoroarenes
Glucocorticoids
Organochlorides
Pregnanes